Duke Gangneung (died 1146), personal name Wang On, was a member of the royal family of Goryeo as the grandson of King Munjong. Through his daughters, he became the father-in-law of the three successive kings (Uijong, Myeongjong, Sinjong) and the maternal grandfather of Huijong and Gangjong. He was known before as Marquess Gangneung.

Biography

Ancestors and relatives

Wang On had two older brothers, they were:
Wang Ja (왕자, 王滋; before 1083–1101); died after became a swordsman.
Wang Won (왕원, 王源; 1083–1170); given title of "Duke Gwangpyeong" (광평공, 廣平公) and married Princess Ansu, King Sukjong's daughter.

Life
Not much information left about his life beside that he received the resident country from his half first cousin and in 1143, he received his royal title as Marquess Gangneung (강릉후, 江陵侯) under his half first cousin once removed's command. He was also given 700 Sik-eup (식읍 700호) and 300 Sik-sil (식실 300호), but eventually died in 1146 and received his new title as Duke Gangneung (강릉공, 江陵公).

Children and Descendants
According to Goryeosa, Wang On had 4 daughters and 2 sons. As the same clan couldn't get married, so the three queens were followed their maternal clan ("Kim"; 김, 金) and since his 5 children were all married to King Injong's children, so Wang On and Injong have a five-fold in-law relationship.

First daughter "Queen Janggyeong" (장경왕후, 莊敬王后)
Married Wang Hyeon, King Uijong; had a son and 3 daughters.
Second daughter "Marchioness Daeryeong"
Married Wang Gyeong, Marquess Daeryeong; had no any issue.
Third daughter "Queen Uijeong" (의정왕후, 義靜王后)
Married Wang Ho, King Myeongjong; had a son and 2 daughters.
Fourth daughter "Queen Seonjeong" (선정왕후, 宣靖王后)
Married Wang Tak, King Sinjong; had 2 sons and 2 daughters.
First son "Wang Yeong" (왕영, 王瑛)
It was said that he had a calm and quiet personality, not greedy and devoted himself to learning. He then married his half second cousin once removed, Princess Seunggyeong and became "Count Gonghwa" (공화백, 恭化伯), then died at 61 years old in 1186.
Second son "Wang Jak" (왕작, 王鷟)
He held the office of a comrade in the middle of the war.

References

Year of birth unknown
1146 deaths
11th-century Korean people
12th-century Korean people